Clive Hale (1937 – 5 June 2005) was an Australian television news and current affairs presenter on the Australian Broadcasting Corporation (ABC) for 38 years.

Biography
Hale was born in Cowell, South Australia on the Eyre Peninsula. He was educated at Norwood High School and studied art at the South Australian School of Art with the intention of being an artist. Hale started his ABC career in Perth in 1959 appearing on Perth ABC-TV's first night on air. In 1967, he was the presenter on the Adelaide edition of This Day Tonight or TDT, a current-affairs broadcast at 7.30 pm. With Hale as the presenter, TDT became hugely influential in South Australian politics. Hale's popularity as the host of the South Australian edition of TDT was such that the ABC printed bumper stickers saying "I like Clive". When This Day Tonight was axed, Hale was the only original presenter left. Hale was the national host of the replacement program Nationwide when it began broadcasting in 1980. He would present the common stories broadcast across Australia with a state-based presenter presenting local current-affairs stories. After the end of Nationwide, Hale became the national presenter of the Late Night News on ABC TV until 1995 when he was replaced by Indira Naidoo. As well, Hale read the weekend news in NSW. For three seasons from 1987, he also presented the antiques show For Love or Money with regular panellists such as antique dealer Peter Cook. He returned to Adelaide before his retirement in 1997. Hale died of cancer in 2005 and was survived by his wife economist Helen Lapsley and son Tony.

References

External links
 The Advertiser story on Hale's death
Tribute from former colleague Richard Morecroft published on 9 June 2005
 ABC media release on Hale's death

People from Cowell, South Australia
People from Adelaide
Australian television presenters
Journalists from South Australia
1937 births
2005 deaths